With Canadians serving on battlefields across Europe and the Pacific, the first ever non-civilian Grey Cup took place in 1942. The Toronto RCAF Hurricanes defeated the Winnipeg RCAF Bombers on an icy field at Varsity Stadium in Toronto.

Canadian Football News in 1942
The WIFU and the IRFU suspended operations for the duration of World War II. A couple of military teams based in Toronto, the RCAF Hurricanes and the Navy York Bulldogs joined the regular ORFU teams like Balmy Beach and the Toronto Indians.  The Ottawa Rough Riders continued operation, but as part of the an Ottawa based league. Out West, a three team Winnipeg city league was formed with the Winnipeg Bombers, the University of Manitoba Bisons and a military team called the RCAF Flyers.

Regular season

Final regular season standings
Note: GP = Games Played, W = Wins, L = Losses, T = Ties, PF = Points For, PA = Points Against, Pts = Points

Western Interprovincial Football Union
NO LEAGUE PLAY

Interprovincial Rugby Football Union
NO LEAGUE PLAY

Bold text means that they have clinched the playoffs.

Grey Cup playoffs
Note: All dates in 1942

Winnipeg City playoffs

The Bombers won the total-point series by 34–29

Ottawa City Finals

ORFU Finals

Western Finals

Eastern Finals

Playoff bracket

Grey Cup Championship
{| cellspacing="10"
| valign="top" |
{| class="wikitable"
! bgcolor="#DDDDDD" colspan="4" | December 5
30th Annual Grey Cup Game: Varsity Stadium - Toronto, Ontario
|-
|| Toronto RCAF Hurricanes 8 || Winnipeg RCAF Bombers 5
|-
| align="center" colspan="4" | Toronto RCAF Hurricanes are the 1942 Grey Cup Champions
|-
|}
|}

1942 Ottawa City Senior Rugby Football Union All-Stars selected by Canadian PressNOTE: During this time most players played both ways, so the All-Star selections do not distinguish between some offensive and defensive positions.QB – P/O Bobby Coulter, Ottawa RCAF Uplands
FW – Joseph "Curley" Moynahan, Ottawa Rough Riders
HB – P/O Tony Golab, Ottawa RCAF Uplands
HB – Tommy Daley, Ottawa Rough Riders
DB – Arnie McWatters, Ottawa Rough Riders
DB – Thain Simon, Ottawa RCAF Uplands
E  – Pete O'Conner, Ottawa Rough Riders
E  – Hart Findley, Ottawa RCAF Uplands
E  – Jack Beull, Ottawa RCAF Uplands
C  – Doug Turner, Ottawa RCAF Uplands
G – Leo Seguin, Ottawa Rough Riders
G – George Fraser, Ottawa Rough Riders
T – F/O George Sprague, Ottawa RCAF Uplands
T – Eric Chipper, Ottawa Rough Riders

1942 Canadian Football Awards
 Jeff Russel Memorial Trophy (IRFU MVP) – no award given due to World War II''
 Imperial Oil Trophy (ORFU MVP) - Bill Stukus - Toronto RCAF Hurricanes

References

 
Canadian Football League seasons
Grey Cups hosted in Toronto